South Road Bridge, Northern Central Railway is a historic stone arch railroad bridge in Springfield Township, York County, Pennsylvania, USA. It was built about 1871. The limestone and brick bridge was built by the Northern Central Railway and crosses the South Branch Codorus Creek.

It was added to the National Register of Historic Places in 1995.

References

Railroad bridges on the National Register of Historic Places in Pennsylvania
Bridges completed in 1871
Bridges in York County, Pennsylvania
National Register of Historic Places in York County, Pennsylvania
Brick bridges in the United States
Stone arch bridges in the United States